Charles Ogilvie may refer to:

 Charles Ogilvie (civil servant), British administrator in India and historian
 Charles Ogilvie (footballer), Scottish amateur footballer
 Charles Ogilvie (sailor), Jamaican sailor
 Charles Ogilvie (merchant), plantation owner, merchant and politician
 Charles Atmore Ogilvie, Church of England clergyman